State Route 657 (SR 657) is a state highway in central Ohio, a U.S. state. While signed as a north–south route, State Route 657 actually travels in a northwest–southeast fashion. The southern terminus of the route is at a T-intersection with SR 13 immediately north of the city limits of Newark.

Route description
This state highway passes through the northwestern quadrant of Licking County and the southwestern corner of Knox County.  SR 657 is not included as a part of the National Highway System, a system of routes deemed most important for the nation's economy, mobility and defense.

History
SR 657 was established in 1937 along the routing between SR 13 and the US 36/SR 3 concurrency that it occupies today.  No significant changes have taken place to the routing of SR 657 since its designation.

Major intersections

References

657
Transportation in Knox County, Ohio
Transportation in Licking County, Ohio